Cerredo (Santiago de Cerredo) is one of 44 parishes in Tineo, a municipality within the province and autonomous community of Asturias, in northern Spain.

It has a population of 275 (INE 2005).

Villages and hamlets
 Besapié 
 Colinas de Arriba 
 Coucellín 
 Fanosa 
 La Mortera 
 Rellon 
 Riocastiello

References

Parishes in Tineo